Joseph Kallinger (born Joseph Lee Brenner III; December 11, 1935 – March 26, 1996) was an American serial killer who murdered three people, and tortured four families. He committed the later crimes with his 12-year-old son Michael.

Early life 
Kallinger was born on December 11, 1935, as Joseph Lee Brenner III at the Northern Liberties Hospital in Philadelphia, Pennsylvania to Joseph Lee Brenner, Jr. and his wife Judith. In December 1937, the child was placed in foster care after his father had abandoned his mother. On October 15, 1939, he was adopted by Austrian immigrants Stephen and Anna Kallinger. 

He was abused by both his adoptive parents so severely that, at age six, he suffered a hernia inflicted by his adoptive father. The punishments Kallinger endured included kneeling on jagged rocks, being locked inside closets, consuming excrement, committing self-injury, being burned with irons, being whipped with belts, and being starved. When he was nine, he was sexually assaulted by a group of neighborhood boys.

As a child, Kallinger often rebelled against his teachers and his adoptive parents. He dreamed of becoming a playwright, and had played the part of Ebenezer Scrooge in the local YWCA's performance of A Christmas Carol in the ninth grade. When Kallinger was 15, he began dating a girl named Hilda Bergman, whom he met at a theater which he was allowed to visit on Saturdays. His parents told him not to see her, but he married her and had two children with her.

She later left him because of the domestic violence she suffered at his hands. Kallinger was hospitalized at St. Mary's on September 4, 1957, due to severe headaches and loss of appetite which doctors believed was a result of stress surrounding his divorce. Kallinger remarried on April 20, 1958, and had five children with his second wife. He was extremely abusive towards his family, and often inflicted the same punishments on them that he had suffered from his adoptive parents.

Throughout the next decade, Kallinger would spend time in and out of mental institutions for amnesia, attempted suicide and committing arson.

Criminal career 
Kallinger was arrested and imprisoned in 1972 when his children went to the police. While in jail, he had scored 82 on an IQ test and was diagnosed with paranoid schizophrenia, and state psychiatrists recommended that he be supervised with his family. The children later recanted their allegations. 

Two years later, one of his children, Joseph, Jr., was found dead in an abandoned construction building two weeks after Kallinger took out a large life insurance policy on his sons. Though Kallinger claimed that Joseph, Jr. had run away from home, the insurance company, suspecting foul play, refused to pay out the claim.

Beginning in November 1974, Kallinger and his 12-year-old son Michael went on a crime spree spanning Philadelphia, Baltimore, and New Jersey. Over the next six weeks, they robbed, assaulted, and sexually abused four families, gaining entrance to each house by pretending to be salesmen. On January 8, 1975, they continued their spree in Leonia, New Jersey. Using a pistol and a knife, they overpowered and tied up the three residents. Then, when others entered the home, they were forced to strip and were bound with cords from lamps and other appliances.

This culminated in the killing of 21-year-old nurse Maria Fasching, the eighth person to arrive. When she refused to follow Kallinger's orders he responded by stabbing her in the neck and back. Another of the residents, still bound, managed to get outside and cry for help. Neighbors saw her and called the police. By the time they arrived the Kallingers had fled, using the city bus as their getaway vehicle and dumping their weapons and a bloody shirt along the way.

Arrest and imprisonment 
Police investigated Kallinger after gathering the bloody shirt and eyewitness testimony that he and his son had been seen in the area. They soon found out about Kallinger's history of domestic violence, Joseph Jr.'s unsolved death, and a series of arsons targeted against buildings he owned. Kallinger and his son were arrested on kidnapping and rape charges. Kallinger was eventually charged with three counts of murder for his son Joseph Jr, Maria Fasching, and a neighborhood boy. Kallinger pleaded insanity, claiming God had told him to kill. 

He was found sane and sentenced to life in prison on October 14, 1976. Michael, meanwhile, was judged to be under his father's control. He was sentenced to a reformatory. Upon his release at 21, he moved out of state and changed his name. While in prison, Kallinger made several suicide attempts, including attempting to set himself on fire. Because of his suicidal and violent behavior, he was transferred to a mental hospital in Trenton, New Jersey. He was then transferred to a mental hospital in Philadelphia on May 18, 1979.

Flora Rheta Schreiber, the author of the bestselling book Sybil, interviewed Kallinger in jail in 1976. The interview was the basis for a book on the case which was published by Simon & Schuster under the title, The Shoemaker: The Anatomy of a Psychotic in 1983. This book was later part of a Son of Sam lawsuit brought by one of the victim's families as Kallinger received royalties for the book. A judge awarded the family earnings from not only Kallinger, but Schreiber and Simon & Schuster as well, leaving Schreiber nearly $100,000 in personal debt due to expenses of the book's research, including phone calls to Kallinger in prison which totaled $1200 per month for several years. A later appellate panel awarded only Kallinger's royalties to the families. 

Michael Korda, editor at Simon & Schuster, said that for many years he received a Christmas card from Kallinger from jail. Schreiber herself grew very close to Kallinger during the writing process, and the two exchanged regular letters and phone calls until Schreiber's death in 1988.

Death
Joseph Kallinger died of heart failure on March 26, 1996, at SCI Cresson. He spent the last 11 years of his life on suicide watch.

See also
 List of serial killers in the United States

References

Further reading 
Joseph Kallinger “The Shoemaker” Information researched and summarized by Christopher Greenlief, Amanda Hall, and Jenna Hafey Department of Psychology Radford University Radford, VA 24142-6946 

1935 births
1996 deaths
American adoptees
American murderers of children
American rapists
American people convicted of murder
American people with disabilities
American prisoners sentenced to life imprisonment
American serial killers
Criminals from Philadelphia
Filicides in the United States
Male serial killers
Murderers for life insurance money
People convicted of murder by New Jersey
People with epilepsy
People with schizophrenia
Prisoners sentenced to life imprisonment by New Jersey
Serial killers who died in prison custody